The 1986 Scott Tournament of Hearts, the Canadian women's national curling championship, was held from February 22 to March 1, 1986 at the Thompson Arena in London, Ontario. The total attendance for the week was 21,023. It was the first year the defending champions would get a berth into the competition and return as Team Canada, who was skipped by Linda Moore.

Team Ontario, who was skipped by Marilyn Darte won the championship on home soil after defeating defending champion Linda Moore and Team Canada 7–3 in the final. This was the first women's championship for Ontario and the first of two skipped by Darte (later Bodogh).

Darte's rink would go onto represent Canada at the 1986 World Women's Curling Championship on home soil in Kelowna, British Columbia, which they also won.

 In Draw 9, Newfoundland skip Sue Anne Bartlett became the first player in Canadian women's championship history to have played in 100 games.
 Canada's 3–2 victory over Newfoundland in the semifinal set the following records:
This still remains the lowest combined score in a semifinal game.
 The six blank ends set a new record for most blank ends in one game, which has since been matched twice. This still remains a record for the most blank ends in a semifinal game.
 Newfoundland blanked three straight ends beginning in the fifth end, which set a record for most consecutive blank ends in a semifinal game which hasn't been broken since.
 The two points scored by Newfoundland also set a record for fewest points scored in a semifinal game by a single team, which hasn't been broken since either.
 The three points scored in the final by Canada set a record for the fewest points scored in a final by one team. This has been matched three times since (and ).

Teams
The teams were listed as follows:

Round Robin Standings
Final Round Robin standings

Round Robin Results
All draw times are listed in Eastern Standard Time (UTC-05:00).

Draw 1
Saturday, February 22, 2:30 pm

Draw 2
Saturday, February 22, 7:30 pm

Draw 3
Sunday, February 23, 2:30 pm

Draw 4
Sunday, February 23, 7:30 pm

Draw 5
Monday, February 24, 9:00 am

Draw 6
Monday, February 24, 2:00 pm

Draw 7
Monday, February 24, 7:30 pm

Draw 8
Tuesday, February 25, 9:00 am

Draw 9
Tuesday, February 25, 2:00 pm

Draw 10
Tuesday, February 25, 7:30 pm

Draw 11
Wednesday, February 26, 9:00 am

Draw 12
Wednesday, February 26, 2:00 pm

Draw 13
Wednesday, February 26, 7:30 pm

Draw 14
Thursday, February 27, 2:00 pm

Draw 15
Thursday, February 27, 7:30 pm

Playoffs

Semifinal
Friday, February 28, 7:30 pm

Final
Saturday, March 1, 2:00 pm

Statistics

Top 5 player percentages
Final Round Robin Percentages

Awards
The all-star team and sportsmanship award winners were as follows:

All-Star Team

Jo Wallace Award 
The Scotties Tournament of Hearts Sportsmanship Award is presented to the curler who best embodies the spirit of curling at the Scotties Tournament of Hearts. The winner was selected in a vote by all players at the tournament. 

Prior to 1998, the award was named after a notable individual in the curling community where the tournament was held that year. For this edition, the award was named after Jo Wallace, a builder in women's curling as she helped organize the "Nifty Fifty" league, the forerunner to the Ontario Senior Ladies Curling Championship and also served as both the vice-president and president of the Canadian Ladies Curling Association.

Notes

References

Scotties Tournament of Hearts
Scott Tournament of Hearts
Scott Tournament Of Hearts, 1986
Sports competitions in London, Ontario
Curling in Ontario
1986 in women's curling
February 1986 sports events in Canada
March 1986 sports events in Canada